Ricardo Sales Alves do Santos, known as Bosco (born 16 November 1980) is a retired Brazilian football defender.

References

1980 births
Living people
Brazilian footballers
Clube Atlético Mineiro players
Örgryte IS players
Ituano FC players
Paulista Futebol Clube players
Grêmio Barueri Futebol players
ABC Futebol Clube players
Esporte Clube Vitória players
Mirassol Futebol Clube players
Paysandu Sport Club players
Esporte Clube Novo Hamburgo players
Ipatinga Futebol Clube players
Association football defenders
Brazilian expatriate footballers
Expatriate footballers in Sweden
Brazilian expatriate sportspeople in Sweden
Allsvenskan players